Mount Vernon is a town in Kennebec County, Maine, United States. The population was 1,721 at the 2020 census. Mount Vernon is included in the Augusta, Maine micropolitan New England City and Town Area. A popular recreation spot in central Maine, the northern area of Mount Vernon is part of the Belgrade Lakes Region, while the southern area is part of the Winthrop Lakes Region.

History
Mount Vernon was incorporated on June 28, 1792, and was named for George Washington's Virginia estate.

Geography

Demographics

2010 census
As of the census of 2010, there were 1,640 people, 693 households, and 487 families living in the town. The racial makeup of the town was 98.2% White, 0.1% African American, 0.4% Native American, 0.1% Asian, 0.1% from other races, and 1.1% from two or more races. Hispanic or Latino of any race were 0.7% of the population.

There were 693 households, of which 27.4% had children under the age of 18 living with them, 56.4% were married couples living together, 8.4% had a female householder with no husband present, 5.5% had a male householder with no wife present, and 29.7% were non-families. 21.9% of all households were made up of individuals, and 8.2% had someone living alone who was 65 years of age or older. The average household size was 2.37 and the average family size was 2.72.

The median age in the town was 45.7 years. 20.1% of residents were under the age of 18; 6.1% were between the ages of 18 and 24; 22.6% were from 25 to 44; 35.9% were from 45 to 64; and 15.4% were 65 years of age or older. The gender makeup of the town was 49.3% male and 50.7% female.

2000 census
As of the census of 2000, there were 1,524 people, 603 households, and 449 families living in the town. There were 956 housing units at an average density of 25.2 per square mile (9.7/km). The racial makeup of the town was 97.64% White, 0.26% African American, 0.52% Native American, 0.20% Asian, 0.13% Pacific Islander, 0.26% from other races, and 0.98% from two or more races. Hispanic or Latino of any race were 0.39% of the population.

There were 603 households, out of which 34.7% had children under the age of 18 living with them, 61.2% were married couples living together, 8.6% had a female householder with no husband present, and 25.5% were non-families. 19.7% of all households were made up of individuals, and 6.0% had someone living alone who was 65 years of age or older.  The average household size was 2.52 and the average family size was 2.88.

In the town, the population was spread out, with 25.6% under the age of 18, 5.9% from 18 to 24, 28.1% from 25 to 44, 30.5% from 45 to 64, and 9.9% who were 65 years of age or older.  The median age was 40 years. For every 100 females, there were 101.1 males.  For every 100 females age 18 and over, there were 98.9 males.

The median income for a household in the town was $39,779, and the median income for a family was $44,605. Males had a median income of $31,250 versus $25,795 for females. The per capita income for the town was $19,668.  About 4.1% of families and 7.1% of the population were below the poverty line, including 6.7% of those under age 18 and 5.5% of those age 65 or over.

Education
Mount Vernon is part of the Maranacook Central School District in Regional School Unit 38. Donna Wolfram is the Superintendent of Schools.

The Maranacook Community School system includes Manchester Elementary School, Mount Vernon Elementary School, Readfield Elementary School, Wayne Elementary School, Maranacook Community Middle School and Maranacook Community High School.

Notable people
 Joseph W. Allen, state legislator
 Joseph Payne, musician
 John H. Rice, U.S. congressman
 Moses Sherburne, politician and Minnesota Supreme Court Justice
 John L. Stevens, U.S. diplomat and Republican Party founder

References

Further reading

External links
 Town of Mount Vernon, Maine
 Maine Office of Tourism

Towns in Kennebec County, Maine
Towns in Maine